This is a list of singles that have peaked in the top 10 of the Billboard Hot 100 during 1988.

122 songs were in the top 10 in 1988, only 113 of them peaked in 1988 (the other nine peaked in either 1987 or 1989). George Michael scored five top ten hits during the year with "Faith", "Father Figure", "One More Try", "Monkey", and "Kissing a Fool", the most among all other artists.

Top-ten singles

1987 peaks

1989 peaks

See also
 1988 in music
 List of Hot 100 number-one singles of 1988 (U.S.)
 Billboard Year-End Hot 100 singles of 1988

References

General sources

Joel Whitburn Presents the Billboard Hot 100 Charts: The Eighties
Additional information obtained can be verified within Billboard's online archive services and print editions of the magazine.

1988
United States Hot 100 Top 10